Neocoenyra petersi is a butterfly in the family Nymphalidae. It is found in southern Tanzania. The habitat consists of montane grassland at altitudes between 2,550 and 2,800 meters.

References

Satyrini
Butterflies described in 1990
Endemic fauna of Tanzania
Butterflies of Africa